Poora Ram Choudhary is an Indian politician from the Bharatiya Janata Party and a member of the Rajasthan Legislative Assembly representing the Bhinmal Vidhan Sabha constituency of Rajasthan.

References 

Living people
Bharatiya Janata Party politicians from Rajasthan
Rajasthan MLAs 2013–2018
1956 births
Rajasthan MLAs 2018–2023